Dmitry Kabalevsky's Piano Sonata No. 2 in E-flat major, Op. 45 was composed in 1945 and dedicated to Emil Gilels. It is the most vast and dramatic of Kabalevsky's three sonatas. A War Sonata such as Sergei Prokofiev's trilogy, its first movement has been compared to that of Dmitri Shostakovich's Symphony No. 7.

Movements
 Allegro moderato. Festivamente - Allegro molto - Festivamente (poco piú mosso del tempo I) - Largamente, drammatico.
 Andante sostenuto - Pochissimo piú mosso - Tempo I.
 Presto assai.

References

Sonatas by Dmitry Kabalevsky
Kabalevsky 02
1945 compositions
Compositions in E-flat major